The Miami Book Fair is an annual two-day street fair and literary festival organized by Miami Dade College.

The fair brings over 300 national and international authors exhibitors to a weeklong gathering and includes pavilions for translation, comics, children, and young adults.

History
Miami Book Fair International, originally known as "Books by the Bay", was founded in 1984 by Miami-Dade College President, Eduardo J. Padrón, Books & Books owner, Mitchell Kaplan, Craig Pollock of BookWorks, and other local bookstore owners in cooperation with the Miami-Dade Public Library System. The two primary organizers of the inaugural 1984 Book Fair from the Miami-Dade Public Library System were Head of Community Relations Margarita Cano and Wolfsonian campus librarian Juanita Johnson.

In 2020, the book fair added virtual content.

Community Partners and Sponsors

Florida Center for the Literary Arts (FCLA)
The Florida Center for the Literary Arts is now the parent organization of the Miami Book Fair International and grew out of the Fair's success. The literary center was conceived to advance the College's literary traditions. A permanent endowment was established with a grant from the John S. and James L. Knight Foundation. Full programming began in January 2002.

As a department of Miami Dade College, FCLA generates programs to support authors and writing, journalism, play and screen writing, reading and literacy as well as the Miami Book Fair International. Outreach consist of reading campaigns and book discussions, writing workshops, author presentations, panel discussions, and master classes. The Center collaborates with a number of Florida-based cultural institutions and other partners in order to advance literary initiatives. The Center reflects of Miami Dade College's commitment to inspire anyone attuned to the world of literature.

Sponsors
Previous corporate sponsors have included Florida Blue, Target, State Farm, Florida Power & Light, American Airlines, Pollo Tropical, Barefoot Wine, Comcast, and Coca-Cola.

Partners
Previous community partners have included Miami-Dade Public Schools. Miami Children's Museum. Miami Art Museum, HistoryMiami, Miami Science Museum, Early Learning Coalition of Miami-Dade/Monroe Counties, The Children's Trust, The Miami Foundation, Greater Miami Convention and Visitors Bureau, The Peacock Foundation, Florida State Department of Public Affairs, and the Kenneth Lattiman Foundation.

National support also comes from National Endowment for the Arts, National Young Arts Foundation, and Mystery Writers of America.

Media Support
Previous media partners have included The Miami Herald, El Nuevo Herald, WPBT Channel 2, WLRN Public Radio, Univision, Diario Las Americas, South Florida Times, Caribbean Today, GRANTA, The New York Times, Book TV on C-SPAN 2.

Events

Festival of Authors
Typically more than 300 authors from around the world take part in the Fair's international Festival of Authors. Writers come from all over the United States, and in previous years, the Fair has welcomed authors from countries like Argentina, Bosnia, Brazil, Canada, China, Cuba, Dominican Republic, England, France, Finland, Guatemala, Haiti, Hong Kong, Israel, Ireland, Jamaica, Mexico, Nicaragua, Philippines, Russia, South Africa, Spain, Taiwan, Trinidad, and other nations.

Evenings With...Series
The Evenings With… Series features readings by world-renowned writers every evening for six consecutive festival days. In past years, guest authors have included recipients of the Nobel Prize for Literature, Pulitzer Prize, National Book Award, Casa de las Americas Prize, Pushcart Prize, O'Henry Award, National Magazine Award, Commonwealth Prize, MacArthur Fellowship and Edgar Award.

Street Fair
The three-day outdoor festival gathers hundreds of booksellers and exhibitors from major publishing houses, small presses, scholarly imprints and foreign publishers. Sellers of used books including signed first editions, original manuscripts and other collectibles also have booths. Millions of books in multiple languages can be found, with book signings and musical entertainment rounding out weekend Fair activity.

Comix Galaxy

Comic Galaxy is a Fair program offering information on graphic novels and the comics world and celebrates their place in United States literary life, as well as their recent rise in popularity and integration into mainstream literature, culture and even education. A prominent part of Comic Galaxy, The School of Comics, is a day-long program that includes six sessions for teachers, librarians, parents and others who are interested in the format. There also exists special training for creators of the genre.

Children's Alley
Children's Alley tailored for young readers, features storytelling, puppets, theatrical performances, educational games, and hands-on activities. Generation Genius is a program hosting thousands of school-aged children each year. As a part of Generation Genius programming, Miami Book Fair International also offers workshops and presentations to local teachers, librarians, and educators. Programs are provided in cooperation with Miami Art Museum, HistoryMiami, Miami Children's Museum, Miami Science Museum, Early Learning Coalition of Miami Dade/Monroe, and Florida Blue.

Ibero-American Authors

Ibero-American Authors is Miami Book Fair International's Spanish Language author program that is presented solely in Spanish or Portuguese. More than 50 authors from various Latin American countries are featured during the eight-days of the Fair. Readings take place every evening during the week and all day during the weekend.

Twilight Tastings and the Kitchen
Miami Book Fair International also includes as part of its list of events hors d-oeuvres, a complimentary cocktails and nightly entertainment before the weeknight author presentations. The Kitchen combines cooking demonstrations and author readings by featured cookbook authors and chefs in an intimate, culinary setting as they recreate recipes from their books.

LGBTQ+ Topics
In keeping with Miami Book Fair International's long tradition of inclusion, authors writing on 
LGBTQ+ topics are represented throughout the festival with titles in fiction, nonfiction, memoir and erotica. Many who appear are Lambda Award winners or finalists.

Miami Writer's Institute
Center for Literature and Theatre faculty, authors, and agents provide workshops pertaining to fiction, nonfiction, poetry, publishing. The Center offers one and three-day workshops, with several taking place in Spanish, as well.

Recent-Year Highlights

2014
For the first time in the history of Miami Book Fair International, the festival has partnered with the National Book Foundation, to provide programming centered around 2014 National Book Award nominees and winners. A sampling of additional authors appearing at Miami Book Fair International 2014 follows:
Robert Baer – "The Perfect Kill: 21 Laws for Assassins"
Richard Blanco – "The Prince of Los Cocuyos: A Miami Childhood"
John Cleese – "So Anyway..."
Andy Cohen – "The Andy Cohen Diaries: A Deep Look At A Shallow Year"
Michael DeForge – "Ant Colony"
Angela DiTerlizzi – "Some Bugs"
Tony DiTerlizzi – "Star Wars: The Adventures of Luke Skywalker, Jedi Knight"
Sheila E – "The Beat of My Own Drum: A Memoir"
Grace Ellis – "Lumberjanes"
Annabelle Gurwitch – "See You Made An Effort: Compliments, Indignities, and Survival Stories from the Edge of 50"
James W. Hall – "The Big Finish: A Thorn Novel"
Ben Hatke – "The Return of Zita the Spacegirl"
Kazu Kibuishi – "Amulet#6"
Nicholas Kristof – "A Path Appears"
Norman Lear – "Even This I Get To Experience"
Brad Meltzer – "I Am Rosa Parks"
Lauren Miller – "Free to Fall"
Susan Minot – "Thirty Girls: A Novel"
George O'Connor – "If I Had A Raptor"
Lauren Oliver – "Rooms: A Novel"
Ann Patchett – "This is the Story of a Happy Marriage"
Ed Piskor – "Hip Hop Family Tree Vol 2: 1981-1983"
Valerie Plame – "Burned"
Questlove – "The World According to Questlove"
Anne Rice – "Prince Lestat: The Vampire Chronicles"
Tavis Smiley – "Death of a King: The Real Story of Dr. Martin Luther King Jr.'s Final Year"
Raina Telgemeier – "Sisters"
John Waters – "Carsick: John Waters Hitchhikes Across America"
Cornel West – "Black Prophetic Fire"
Eveline Pierre "The Secret to Winning Big"

2013

To commemorate 500 years since Juan Ponce de León first landed in Florida, the 30th edition of the Fair celebrated the culture and literature of Spain. Spanish writers and artists shared the language, culture and literature of Spain.
A sampling of authors who appeared at Miami Book Fair International 2013 follows: 
 Jeff Abbott – Downfall
 Mitch Albom – The First Phone Call from Heaven: A Novel
 Reza Aslan – Zealot: The Life and Times of Jesus of Nazareth
 Paul Auster – Report From the Interior
 Holly Black – Doll Bones
 Stanley Crouch – Kansas City Lighting: The Rise and Times of Charlie Parker
 Kwame Dawes – Duppy Conqueror: New and Selected Poems
 Delia Ephron – Sister Mother Husband Dog: Etc.
 Ana Fuentes – From the Dragon's Mouth: Ten True Stories That Reveal the True China
 Nikki Giovanni – Chasing Utopia: A Hybrid
 Doris Kearns Goodwin – The Bully Pulpit: Theodore Roosevelt, William Howard Taft, and the Golden Age of Journalism
 Dr. Carl Hart – High Price: A Neuroscientist's Journey of Self-Discovery That Challenges Everything You Know About Drugs and Society
 John Heilemann – Double Down: Game Change 2012
 Anjelica Huston – A Story Lately Told: Coming of Age in Ireland, London and New York 
 Andrew Kaufman – I'm in Miami, Bitch!: The Disappearing Street Art of Wynwood 
 Gordon Korman – The Hypnotists: Book 1
 Diane Ladd – A Bad Afternoon for a Piece of Cake: A Collection of Ten Short Stories
 Wally Lamb – We Are Water: A Novel 
 Adam Mansbach – The Dead Run
 Chris Matthews – Tip and the Gipper: When Politics Worked 
 D.T. Max – Every Love Story Is a Ghost Story: A Life of David Foster Wallace
 Terry McMillan – Who Asked You?
 Brad Meltzer – History Decoded: The 10 Greatest Conspiracies of All Time
 David N. Meyer – The Bee Gees: The Biography
 Jacquelyn Mitchard – What We Saw at Night

2012
The featured country of 2012's Miami Book Fair International was Paraguay. Paraguayan culture was displayed through film, dance, and fine and folkloric arts.

A sampling of authors who appeared at Miami Book Fair International 2012 follows:
 Martin Amis – Lionel Asbo: State of England 
 Nate Berkus – The Things That Matter 
 Justin Cronin – The Twelve
 Aline Crumb – Drawn Together: The Collected Works of Aline & R. Crumb
 Andre Debus III – Townie: A Memoir
 Junot Diaz – This is How You Lose Her
 Emma Donoghue – Room
 Tim Dorsey – Pineapple Grenade 
 Carolina Garcia-Aguilera – Magnolia
 Chris Hayes – Twilight of the Elites: America After Meritocracy 
 Mark Helprin – In Sunlight and In Shadow
 Jamal Joseph – Panther Baby: A Life of Rebellion & Reinvention
 Daniel Kirk – Library Mouse: A Museum Adventure
 Anne Lamott – Help, Thanks, Wow: The Three Essential Prayers
 Jessica Martinez – The Space Between Us
 Diana McCaulay – Huracan
 Andrew McCarthy – The Longest Way Home
 Christopher Pike – Witch World
 Bill O'Reilly – Killing Kennedy
 Lemony Snicket – A Series of Unfortunate Events
 Jake Tapper – The Outpost: An Untold Story of American Valor
 Jeffrey Toobin – The Oath: The Obama White House and the Supreme Court
 Irvine Welsh – Skagboys
 Sherri Winston – President of the Whole Fifth Grade
 Tom Wolfe – Back to Blood

2011

Miami Book Fair International 2011 included demonstrations of Chinese culture and art, and discussions of social issues facing contemporary China. An international symposium on Chinese language, culture, and communication was held.

A sampling of authors who participated in Miami Book Fair International 2011 follows: 
 Dr. Arthur Agatston – The South Beach Wake-Up Call
 Tom Angleberger – Darth Paper Strikes Back
 David Brooks – The Social Animal: The Hidden Sources of Love, Character, and Achievement
 Dan Clowes – The Death-Ray
 John Connolly – The Infernals
 Bob Edwards – My Life in Radio
 Jeffrey Eugenides – The Marriage Plot
 Cristina García – Dreams of Significant Girls
 Dr. Paul George – Florida's 11th Circuit Court
 Lev Grossman – The Magician King
 Sandra Gutierrez – The New Southern-Latino Table
 Ellen Hopkins – Perfect
 Jeff Kinney – Diary of a Wimpy Kid
 Megan McDonald – Judy Moody, Girl Detective
 Michael Moore – Here Comes Trouble
 Elizabeth Nunez – Boundaries
 Susan Orlean – Rin Tin Tin
 Chuck Palahniuk – Damned
 Christopher Paolini – Inheritance
 Karen Russell – Swamplandia!
 Esmeralda Santiago – Conquistadora
 Jon Scieszka – SPHDZ Book 3
 Touré – Post Blackness
 Calvin Trillin – Quite Enough of Calvin Trillin
 Belle Yang – Forget Sorrow: An Ancestral Tale

2010
For the first time this year, the fair dedicated its international space to one country, Mexico, in celebration of the bicentennial of the Central American nation's independence and the centennial of its 1910 revolution. Featured were literary feasts served as fiestas, with author presentations and roundtables on subjects such as Mexican boleros. Ballet performances, art and photography exhibitions, a movie series and theater performances also honored the country of Mexico.

The following is a sampling of authors who participated in Miami Book Fair International 2010 activities: 
 Maha Akhtar – La Nieta de la Maharaní
 Kim Anthony – Unfavorable Odds
 Dan Archer – The Honduran Coup: A Graphic History
 Ann Beattie – The New Yorker Stories
 Susanna Daniel – Stiltsville
 Edwidge Danticat – Create Dangerously: Immigrant Artists at Work
 Kate DiCamillo – Bink & Gollie
 Tony DiTerlizzi – The Search for Wondla
 Dave Eggers – Zeitoun
 Jonathan Franzen – Freedom
 Willie Geist – American Freak Show: The Completely Fabricated Stories of Our New National Treasures
 James W. Hall – Silencer
 Vicki Hendricks – Florida Gothic Stories
 Sebastian Junger – War
 Chip Kidd – Shazam!
 Hari Kunzru – Writing on the Edge: Great Contemporary Writers on the Frontline of Crisis
 Meghan McCain – Dirty Sexy Politics
 Ben Mezrich – The Accidental Billionaires: The Founding of Facebook
 Walter Mosley – The Last Days of Ptolemy Grey
 Beatriz Rivera – When a Tree Falls
 Scott Turow – Innocent
 Lisa Unger – Fragile
 Judith Viorst – Lulu and the Brontosaurus
 Scott Westerfeld – Behemoth
 Simon Winchester – The Atlantic: Biography of an Ocean

2009
Environmental issues were in the forefront of Miami Book Fair International 2009, from author presentations to green activities to making ecologically sound choices in Fair logistics. The college used native plants on stages, as well as entrances. These natives were then planted in the community to help offset the carbon emissions of the book fair. Miami Book Fair International and MDC's Earth Ethics Institute procured the plants from local nursery. Bike Valet parking service was available to each cyclist, and numerous rethink, reduce, reuse, and recycle educational programs were promoted.

The following is a sampling of authors who appeared at Miami Book Fair International 2009:
 Lidia Bastianich – Lidia Cooks from the Heart of Italy
 Edna Buchanan – The Corpse Had a Familiar Face
 Meg Cabot – Allie Finkle's Rules for Girls
 Susie Essman – What Would Susie Say? 
 Dan Goldman – 08: A Graphic Diary of the Campaign Trail
 Al Gore – Our Choice
 Senator Bob Graham – America: The Owner's Manual
 Heather Graham – Unhallowed Ground
 James Grippando – Intent to Kill
 Dr. Sanjay Gupta – Cheating Death
 John Hodgman – More Information Than You Require
 Gwen Ifill – The Breakthrough: Politics and Race in the Age of Obama
 Sid Jacobson – Che: A Graphic Biography
 Wally Lamb – Wishin' and Hopin'''
 Peter Lerangis – The 39 Clues Jonathan Lethem – Chronic City Tao Lin – Shoplifting from American Apparel 
 Jeff Lindsay – Dexter By Design Ralph Nader – Only the Super Rich Can Save Us Joyce Carol Oates – Little Bird of Heaven Iggy Pop – The Stooges: An Authorized and Illustrated Story 
 Sherman Alexie – War Dances Luis Alberto Urrea – Into the Beautiful North: A Novel Larry Wilmore – I'd Rather We Got Casinos and Other Black Thoughts''

See also
 Florida literature
 Books in the United States

References

External links

 Official website
 The Center for Literature and Theatre @ Miami Dade College Tumblr Page
 Florida Center for the Literary Arts at Miami Dade College YouTube Page
 Miami Book Fair International History on C-SPAN 2 Book TV 
 Major Book Fairs in the US
 New York Times Article A Book Fair That Grew, Propelling the Arts in Miami

Tourist attractions in Miami-Dade County, Florida
Book fairs in the United States
Festivals in Miami
1984 establishments in Florida
Festivals established in 1984